The Punk Terrorist Anthology Vol. 2 is a compilation album released in 2005 by American crust punk band Nausea on Brad Logan's Blacknoise Recordings. The album consists of live, unreleased, and demo songs.

Track list

References

Nausea (band) albums
2005 compilation albums